Heterostegane aurantiaca is a moth of the family Geometridae first described by Warren in 1894. It is found in the Khasi Hills of India and probably in Sri Lanka.

References

Moths of Asia
Moths described in 1894